Skelton Barnaby Knaggs (27 June 1911 – 30 April 1955) was an English stage actor who also appeared in films, especially in horror films.

Biography
Knaggs was born in the Hillsborough district of Sheffield, England. Knaggs moved to London where he trained as an actor at the Royal Academy of Dramatic Art, and subsequently became a Shakespearean actor. In addition to appearing on stage in Shakespeare's Cymbeline, Knaggs appeared in a few British films, including an uncredited role as a German orderly in Michael Powell's The Spy in Black.

 
At some point he moved to Los Angeles, California and found work as a character actor in Hollywood. Diminutive and distinctive-looking, with a strongly featured pock-marked face and charismatically voiced with an English Midlands provincial accent, he was cast in sinister roles, often in horror films. These ranged from uncredited bit parts to prominent roles in the Sherlock Holmes thriller Terror by Night, the all-star monster rally House of Dracula and three Val Lewton productions including The Ghost Ship. In the latter, a voice-over narrative by Knaggs is heard, representing the thoughts of his character, a mute seaman.

Back in London, he married Thelma Crawshaw in 1949, then returned to Hollywood. The last film in which he appeared was Fritz Lang's period adventure based on J. Meade Falkner's novel Moonfleet.

Death
An alcoholic, Knaggs died of cirrhosis of the liver in Los Angeles in 1955 at the age of 43. His body was buried in the 'Hollywood Forever Cemetery' in Los Angeles.

Filmography

References

External links

English male stage actors
English male film actors
Male actors from Sheffield
1911 births
1955 deaths
Deaths from cirrhosis
Burials at Hollywood Forever Cemetery
20th-century English male actors
British expatriate male actors in the United States
Alcohol-related deaths in California